Dennis Reynolds is a fictional character on the FX series It's Always Sunny in Philadelphia (2005–present), portrayed by Glenn Howerton, and created by Rob McElhenney, Howerton, and Charlie Day. He is the co-owner of Paddy's Pub, alongside his childhood friends Charlie Kelly and Mac. He is the twin brother of Dee Reynolds, legal son to Frank Reynolds, and is also roommates with Mac. He often plays the lead role in many of the gang's schemes.

Overview
Dennis is the twin brother of Dee and co-owner of Paddy's Pub. He has been friends with Mac and Charlie since childhood. The most amoral member of the group, Dennis is narcissistic, hypersexual, selfish, and abrasive. He is a graduate of the University of Pennsylvania and has shown to have extensive knowledge of psychology. Dennis has shown to be predatory towards women, as shown in a self-described system where he exploits women's trust and abuses them emotionally in order to have sex with them known as the D.E.N.N.I.S. system.

Character biography

Early life
Dennis was born August 18, 1976, immediately after his twin sister Dee. He was raised by his mother Barbara and father Frank. In the Season 2 finale, "Dennis and Dee Get a New Dad", Dennis and Dee find out from their mother that they are the children of Bruce Mathis, a wealthy, kind-hearted philanthropist whom Barbara had an affair with. Dennis was beloved by his mother, who left him with her mansion after her death (on the condition that Frank would not be allowed to enter the property). 

He considered himself to be popular in high school, although it was later revealed that he was never that popular and that his prom date slept with Mac. Dennis graduated from the University of Pennsylvania with a minor in psychology and was a member of the Delta Omega Lambda fraternity.

Personality
Dennis displays signs of narcissistic, antisocial and borderline personality disorder, the latter of which he was diagnosed with and prescribed medicine  for in "Psycho Pete Returns". Over the course of the series, Dennis's mental condition has significantly worsened, resulting in him becoming more delusional and deranged, even referring to himself as "The Golden God" on numerous occasions. Dennis also has an extremely fragile ego, as revealed through his upset reactions to being rejected by his peers at his high school reunion and receiving a one-star (and an eventual zero star) rating on a dating website.

It has been suggested numerous times that Dennis is a serial killer, as shown when it is revealed he keeps zip ties, duct tapes and gloves in his car and when he threatened to turn Dee's skin into a lampshade or a piece of high-end luggage. When asked about the possibility of directly confronting the question of Dennis being a serial killer in an interview with Rolling Stone, series creator Rob McElhenney claimed that they are "about close to (the question) it as possible", and the audience will go along as the series progresses.

Dennis is a fan of Bryan Adams, Rick Astley, and Steve Winwood. He drives a 1993 Range Rover County. The car is blown up with an RPG after Dennis leaves for North Dakota in the Season 12 finale. He purchases a near-identical Range Rover in "The Gang Gets New Wheels".

Sexuality
Dennis has shown to be predatory towards women. He lost his virginity at age 14 when he had sex with his school librarian Ms. Klinsky, although he is in denial that this is, in fact, rape. He keeps a camcorder in his bedroom, which he uses to record every woman he has sex with and keeps and rates each tape. He has a self-designed "D.E.N.N.I.S System", where he gaslights and emotionally abuses women in order to have sex with them before abandoning them. 

It has been implied that Dennis is a serial rapist, as he has claimed that the words "no", "stop" and "don't" never stop him from going ahead with his advances (something Mac later confirms in "How Mac Got Fat" when he tells a priest that Dennis often advises him to "never let someone's resistance stop you from getting what you want") and that a woman on a boat with him in the middle of the ocean will not turn down sex because of "the implication" that he will kill her if she refuses to sleep with him. 

He revealed in "Time's Up for The Gang" that he has received text messages giving consent from every woman he had sex with, although he implies that he may have sent them himself. It was revealed in "Reynolds v. Reynolds: The Cereal Defense" that Dennis has numerous bench warrants of sexual misconduct against him in court.

Relationship with the Gang
Dennis has known Mac and Charlie since childhood and is roommates with Mac. They shared an apartment together until it was burned down in the Season 9 finale "The Gang Squashes Their Beefs". They then moved into Dee's apartment and had to share a bed with an old man as a part of a bet with Frank ("Mac and Dennis Move to the Suburbs"). Their old apartment was rebuilt in Season 12, and both Mac and Dennis moved back by Season 13. Dennis often partners up with Mac for numerous schemes, including the aliases "Honey and Vinegar" as well as selling merchandise for Paddy's Pub together. They also heavily rely on each other in their personal lives, one instance being Dennis having Mac skin an apple before eating it ("Mac and Dennis Break Up"). Despite their friendship, Dennis is often annoyed at Mac, mostly for his apparent attraction to him.

Dennis views Dee as inferior to him and is controlling for her, often joining the remainder of the gang in mocking and despising Dee. Despite their sibling rivalry, Dennis and Dee often team up together, especially in the game of Chardee MacDennis, where Dennis and Dee perform exceptionally against Mac, Charlie, and Frank (mainly through cheating and rigging the game). There are also instances where Dennis looks out for Dee, such as when he showed care for her when she gives birth and when he became concerned that she will fail miserably when her stand-up career began to apparently take off.

Like his sister, Dennis despises Frank as a father, and was initially reluctant to let Frank join 'The Gang'. After it was revealed that Frank is not their biological father, both Dennis and Dee stopped treating him like a father, rather merely as a member of the gang. Their relationship remained relatively hostile in the earlier seasons of the series, with Frank at one point selling Dennis out to prostitution in order to pay off $25,000 owed to the mafia ("The Gang Gets Whacked"). Over time, however, Dennis begins to partner with Frank more often, including helping him cook up Paddy's books through several money laundering outlets ("Sweet Dee Gets Audited"), teaming up together to buy out a ski resort ("The Gang Hits the Slopes"), and bathing together at Dee's apartment ("Ass Kickers United: Mac and Charlie Join a Cult").

Family

In the Season 6 premiere "Mac Fights Gay Marriage", Dennis marries Maureen Ponderosa, his high school sweetheart. After falling out with her, Dennis attempts to divorce Maureen, but she hires The Lawyer to negotiate with Jack Kelly, Dennis's lawyer. They reached a settlement where Maureen agrees to divorce Dennis on the grounds that he pays for her alimony and $90,000 debt, much to Dennis's displeasure. In Season 8, Dennis attempts to have Maureen sign off their alimony agreement as she prepares to marry Liam McPoyle, but Dennis has sex with her upon seeing her recent breast implants. The wedding would later be called off when chaos breaks out after Maureen's brother Bill spiked the wedding milk bowl. Over time, Maureen begins to transform herself into a cat through plastic surgery as well as catlike behavior, naming herself 'Bastet'. In the episode "McPoyle vs. Ponderosa: The Trial of the Century", during a separate trial, Dennis tries to argue in a court that he should no longer have to pay alimony to Maureen as she no longer considered herself human. Maureen dies in season 12 after attempting to climb the roof of a building and falling off, though it is heavily implied that Dennis might have pushed her ("Making Dennis Reynolds a Murderer", "Paddy's Has a Jumper").

In the Season 12 finale "Dennis' Double Life", Dennis reveals that he has fathered a child named Brian Jr. in North Dakota, under the false name 'Brian LeFevre', after a layover there ("The Gang Beats Boggs"). He attempts to fake his own death to avoid caring for the child, but later decides to move to North Dakota to raise him. He would return to Philadelphia in the premiere of Season 13.

References

It's Always Sunny in Philadelphia characters
Fictional alcohol abusers
Fictional characters with borderline personality disorder
Television characters introduced in 2005
Fictional characters from Philadelphia
Fictional cocaine users
Fictional twins
Fictional victims of child sexual abuse
Fictional victims of sexual assault
Atheism in television
Fictional bartenders